Lattanzio Mainardi (fl. 16th century) was an Italian painter of the late-Renaissance or Mannerist period. Originally from or near Bologna and referred to as Lattanzio Bolognese by Giovanni Baglione. He painted frescoes for the Chapel of Pope Sixtus V in Santa Maria Maggiore, including the figures of Tamar, Fares, Zara, Solomon y Boaz. He died at the age of 37 in Viterbo, while returning to Bologna.

References

People from the Province of Bologna
16th-century Italian painters
Italian male painters
Painters from Bologna
Italian Renaissance painters
Mannerist painters
Fresco painters